Polona Barič (born 15 May 1992) is a retired Slovenian handballer who played for RK Krim and the Slovenian women's national team.

She participated at the 2018 European Women's Handball Championship.

References

External links

1992 births
Living people
People from Izola
Slovenian female handball players